Charles Bathurst PC (1754 – 13 August 1831), known as Charles Bragge from 1754 to 1804, was a British politician of the early 19th century.

Background and education
Born Charles Bragge, Bathurst was the son of Charles Bragge, of Cleve Hill in Gloucestershire, and his wife Anne Bathurst, the granddaughter of Sir Benjamin Bathurst, younger brother of Allen Bathurst, 1st Earl Bathurst. He was educated at Winchester School and New College, Oxford and studied law at Lincoln's Inn in 1772, being called to the bar in 1778. In 1804 he assumed by Royal licence the surname of Bathurst in lieu of Bragge when he inherited Lydney Park in Gloucestershire from his maternal uncle Poole Bathurst.

Political career
Bathurst sat as a member of parliament (MP) for Monmouth from 1790 to 1796, for Bristol from 1796 to 1812, for Bodmin from 1812 to 1818 and for Harwich from 1818 to 1823. He was invested a member of the Privy Council in 1801 and held office under Henry Addington as Treasurer of the Navy from 1801 to 1803 and as Secretary at War from 1803 to 1804. He also served under the Duke of Portland as Master of the Mint (1806–07) and under Lord Liverpool as Chancellor of the Duchy of Lancaster (1812–23) and President of the Board of Control (1821–22).

In 1796 Bathurst was made an honorary freeman of the Society of Merchant Venturers, due to his support for the slave trade.

Family
Bathurst died in August 1831. He had married Charlotte, daughter of Anthony Addington, in 1781 and with her had 2 sons and 2 daughters. He was succeeded in turn by their eldest son Charles and their younger son, Reverend William Hiley Bathurst who became the grandfather of Charles Bathurst, 1st Viscount Bledisloe. His wife survived him by eight years and died in May 1839.

References

External links
 

1754 births
1831 deaths
People educated at Winchester College
Alumni of New College, Oxford
Members of Lincoln's Inn
Masters of the Mint
Members of the Parliament of Great Britain for English constituencies
British MPs 1790–1796
British MPs 1796–1800
Members of the Parliament of the United Kingdom for English constituencies
UK MPs 1801–1802
UK MPs 1802–1806
UK MPs 1806–1807
UK MPs 1807–1812
UK MPs 1812–1818
UK MPs 1818–1820
UK MPs 1820–1826
Chancellors of the Duchy of Lancaster
Members of the Privy Council of the United Kingdom
Members of the Parliament of the United Kingdom for constituencies in Cornwall
Charles
Members of the Society of Merchant Venturers
Presidents of the Board of Control